The Association of Residential Cleaning Services International (ARSCI) is a nonprofit international trade organization established in 2003. ARCSI provides information regarding cleaning procedures and techniques to professionals and a high-quality cleaning experience to consumers. All members must follow a very strict Code of Ethics.

ARCSI's Seal of Accreditation 
ARCSI’s Seal of Accreditation is awarded to professional residential cleaning companies who meet a rigorous set of industry and business standards since 2010.

House Cleaning Technician (HCT) Certification 
In October 2011, the Institute for Service Excellence announced its designation as the only IICRC-approved school for the House Cleaning Technician certification. A certified House Cleaning Technician is trained to properly care for both homes and health.

Started by David Kiser, the founding president of ARCSI, along with IICRC-approved instructor Bruce Vance, the HCT certification program enables individual technicians and companies to improve their qualification.

Community involvement 
ARCSI members and their employees are actively involved in their local communities, taking part in free house cleanings for women undergoing cancer treatments or for disabled veterans, or sponsoring youth sports teams, and involvement with youth service organizations.

Projects 
 Cleaning for Kids - a joint project between ARSCI and Ronald McDonald House Charities, where member volunteers provide residential cleaning services at no charge to the Ronald McDonald Houses in their communities.
 Cleaning For A Reason - in alliance with the Cleaning For A Reason foundation, ARCSI volunteer members provide professional house cleaning, and maid services to women undergoing treatment for any type of cancer.

Milestones 
2003 - Association is established by the name Association of Residential Cleaning Professionals (ARCP). First ARCP Magazine published. ARCP forms alliance with ISSA.

2004 - David Kiser is elected first association President. First ARCP National Convention is held in New Orleans.

2005 - Board of Directors holds first Strategic Planning meeting.

2006 - ARCP becomes ARSCI. Tom Stewart is elected first ARCSI President.

2007 - ARCSI Membership tops 300. Debbie Sardone is elected first ARCSI female President.

2009 - ARCSI hires first professional association executive, Ernie Hartong and moves world headquarters to Columbus, OH.

2010 - ARCSI establishes the Residential Cleaning Seal of Excellence.

2012 - IICRC approves House Cleaning Technician certification and first class is held in Dallas TX.

2014 - Certified House Cleaning Technicians count is 300.

2015 - Association membership tops 600. Jeff Lange is elected president.

References 

Organizations established in 2003
Service industry associations